Ju Manu Rai (Nepali: जुमानु राई; born 24 January 1984 in Sarlahi District) is a Nepalese footballer, who currently plays for Nepal Police Club and the national side of Nepal.

Career
He used to play the local tournaments of football at Harion and other parts of Sarlahi  and often bag with awards and shields during childhood. He was introduced to the public in Boys Union in an unsuccessful trial bid. He also played Association football for the Nepal Police Club, Machindra FC in the  Division League. He was watched by Maldivian Club Vyansa. He played in the Kheladi Cup where he scored 5 goals. He later went on to play for All Youth Linkage of Maldives in the 2009 Wataniya Dhivehi League 3rd Round. He played half of the season scoring 11 goals. He is currently the captain of Nepal Police Club and holds a permanent post as an employee of Nepal Police.

International career
On April 5, 2006, he made his debut against Brunei at AFC Challenge Cup, which was held in Bangladesh. Rai has played for the Nepal national football team. In 2008, he was on form after scoring 5 goals in 4 matches in AFC Challenge Cup. He has also played for Nepal in the SAFF Championship 2008 held in Maldives and Sri Lanka. He scored two goals in a friendly match against Mohun Bagan which Nepal won 3-1. He also played in SAFF Championship 2009 which was held in Bangladesh. He scored the goal against Maldives national football team. His goal helped Nepal to draw 1-1. But Nepal Were out of the tournament. He scored four goals in three matches in British Gurkha Cup 2010. Nepal Police Club were out of the quarter-finals defeated by Three Star Club, who later on to be the champions. He has current goal tally of 10 making him the fourth highest scorer for Nepal.

On 5 September 2013 SAFF Championship, Jumanu scored the second goal in a 2-1 win over  rival India, taking a pass from Rabin Shrestha to score his 11th international goals.

Honours
 2007: Pulsar Player of the Year (PoY)

References

External links
 

1984 births
Living people
People from Sarlahi District
Nepalese footballers
Nepal international footballers
Nepalese expatriate footballers
Association football forwards
Expatriate footballers in the Maldives
Machhindra F.C. players
South Asian Games bronze medalists for Nepal
South Asian Games medalists in football